Ready for Takeoff is an Australian observational and airline television series aired on the Nine Network on 30 October 2015. The series was renewed for a second season and premiered on 7 October 2016.

The series takes viewers behind the scenes of operations at Australian airline Qantas, who funded the production of the program.

Series overview

Episodes

Season 1 (2015)

Season 2 (2016)

Broadcast
Internationally, the series airs in Ireland on TV3, debuting on 6 July 2016.

See also
Airways, a similar 2009 series behind the scenes of Tiger Airways Australia.

References

2010s Australian documentary television series
2015 Australian television series debuts
2016 Australian television series endings
Australian factual television series
Documentary television series about aviation
Nine Network original programming
Television series by Fremantle (company)